is a 13-episode Japanese anime series very loosely based on the 80's J-pop Idol group Lemon Angel. It is the second anime to be based on the group after the 1987–88 Fuji TV late night anime Lemon Angel, which was also a spin-off to the adult OVA series Cream Lemon.

Plot
The series is set in the year 2017, and music is delivered in a technological fashion. Previously a pop band named Lemon Angel made it big, but they only performed in large flat screens that serve as ad spaces in the city. After a while, the band disappeared, leaving no trace. Tomo Minaguchi, whose deceased senpai was somehow involved with Lemon Angel, was invited to join an audition aimed to form a new Lemon Angel band, or revive it with new members. Tomo reluctantly agrees.

As the series progresses, Tomo bonds with the other four members of the band (out of the audition), and along the way, each learn the values of trust, friendship and inner strength, as they do their best to perform for the Lemon Angel Project.

Characters

Main

Tomo is the protagonist of the series and lead singer of the Lemon Angels. She has light blue hair with a cowlick and two long pigtails. Very squeaky-voiced, clumsy, and loves to eat. She's not that good coming into the Project, but gained both singing and dancing skills as the series progressed. It is revealed that Yui created the former Lemon Angels lead singer Anne in her image. Tomo is best friends with Saya and Erika.

Saya is Tomo's best friend and a Lemon Angel. She has red hair done in pigtails. She was once a magazine model and a cosplay model at the same time, but left both jobs to pursue a life of singing. She states that she wants to sing to make others happy. Although she is assertive and stuck up, she has inner feelings (best friend) for Tomo and Erika and is quick to defend them against hostile rivals. She is a horrible cook, as shown in episode eight when she made the other Lemon Angels sick from her cooking.

Erika is Tomo's other best friend and a Lemon Angel. Due to her origins, she is tall with dark skin and white hair. This alienation encouraged her to join the casting call for Lemon Angel so that she can become part of a group. Erika was the first to befriend Tomo and forcefully helped Saya even though she repeatedly rejected it. She always sticks up for Tomo and Saya and wants everyone to stop fighting and to become friends. She came to live in Japan from Brazil with her adopted brother Takumi, who later became a famous rock star of the band Third Sence. She was constantly picked on by her peers (except for her friends) for being a foreigner and not knowing anything about Japanese culture even though she sometimes dresses up as a ninja. She was manipulated in episode 4 by Haruka and the other unnamed characters to meet Takumi when it turned out he was unavailable to meet them. Erika is half Brazilian from her father's side while her mother is Japanese. She is also a great cook.

Miru is one of the new Lemon Angels and the smallest of the group. She has long, flowing black hair, and seems to dress in the Gothic Lolita style. Very soft spoken and does not talk or sing unless she really needs to. She lost her parents in a fire at a young age and became a hikkikomori until she listened to the Lemon Angels. From that day forward, she wanted to become just like Anne, the lead singer for the last group. With this she was determined to become the lead singer of the newly formed Lemon Angels but withdrew from her desires once she discovered that Tomo was just like Anne and deserved to be lead singer instead.

Fuyumi is one of the Lemon Angels. Has short brown hair and is a meganekko. She grew up as a successful child actress and acted with Haruka, but as she got older, she went more into singing and volunteering. She is very shy and has a heavy conscience. She is also a good cook with a particular fondness for doughnuts which she normally carries around.

Miki is the leader of the group and a Lemon Angel, although she did not try out for the role. She helped create the Project with Yui and was good friends with her (just like Tomo). She is very strict on the outside but deep down inside she is very caring for the other Angels. Due to her excellent programing skills and involvement with the previous Lemon Angels, Miki has a history with Shinya and an openly hostile one at that.

Supporting

Kogure is the producer of the new Lemon Angels who also worked with Yui with the previous Lemon Angels Project (L.A.P.). He decided to create a second Lemon Angels in order to fulfill Yui's dreams of having real people sing her songs with Tomo as the lead vocalist.

Yui is the original creator of the Lemon Angel Project and Tomo's senpai. She died from walking in front of a bus after being heartbroken with Shinya's rejection.

Takumi is a famous rock star in a band called Third Sence and Erika's little brother. He was adopted into their family when he was still an infant and knew about his past before coming to Japan from Brazil. He is very devoted to Erika and spends as much time with her as he can when he isn't working.

She is Fuyumi's childhood friend. Very assertive and cares about herself and pushing others down. She tried out to become a Lemon Angel but gave up in episode 5 after a brief but tense stiff with one of the dance coordinators. After that, she continues to be Fuyumi's friend and confidant.

Keiko is the Lemon Angel's temporary manager. She used to be Saya's manager at the magazine company but was fired after her involvement with Saya's defection.

Shinya is the producer hired by Nouvelle when they thought that the first Lemon Angels will be a big hit. Shinya flirts with Yui since she is a great programmer and its original creator. Shinya was the cause of Yui's death when he declined Yui's love claiming that he only cares for her because of her programming abilities and nothing more. Yui was hit by a bus later that evening while walking out on the streets. Despite what he said, Shinya deep down did care for Yui but he felt that his experience and her programing skills were only tools and nothing can come from that.

Episode list

Music
Opening Theme:
"Angel addict": Eps. 01 - 05
Performed by: Ryou Shihono, Ami Koshimizu, Miki Maruyama
"Angel addict": Ep. 06
Performed by: Mai Kadowaki
"Angel addict": Ep. 07
Performed by: Juri Hirama
"Angel addict": Ep. 08
Performed by: Ryou Shihono
"Angel addict": Ep. 09
Performed by: Minori Chihara
"Angel addict": Ep. 10
Performed by: Ami Koshimizu
"Angel addict": Ep. 11
Performed by: Miki Maruyama
"Angel addict": Ep. 12
Performed by: Kaori Shimizu, Ryou Shihono
"Angel addict": Ep. 13
Performed by: Ryou Shihono, Mai Kadowaki, Ami Koshimizu, Minori Chihara, Juri Hirama, Miki Maruyama

Ending Theme:

Lyrics by: Shouko Fujibayashi
Composition by:
Arrangement by:
Performed by: Nao Nagasawa

Insert Theme:
"EVOLUTION" (First Lemon Angel version) - Ep. 01
 by Third Sense - Ep. 04
"SCAR" by Shinya Himuro - Ep. 07
"NEVER GIVE UP" (Second Lemon Angel version) - Ep. 13

Soundtracks
Lemon Angel Project: Theme song - "Never Give Up Evolution"

1: "NEVER GIVE UP"
2: "L.A.P CLIMAX DIALOGUE"
3: "EVOLUTION"
4: "NEVER GIVE UP (Karaoke ver.)"
5: "EVOLUTION (Karaoke ver.)"

Lemon Angel Project: Character song 1

1: Saya: "I will"
2: Miki: "Mikazuki"
3: Saya: "I will (Karaoke ver.)"
4: Miki: "Mikazuki (Karaoke ver.)"
5: Lemon Angel message

Lemon Angel Project: Character song 2

1: Miru: "Promise you"
2: Tomo: "Watashi wo sagashite"
3: Miru: "Promise you (Karaoke ver.)"
4: Tomo: "Watashi wo sagashite (Karaoke ver.)"
5: Lemon Angel message

Lemon Angel Project: Character song 3

1 Erika: "Smile means love"
2 Fuyumi: "Kaze no youni"
3 Erika: "Smile means love (Karaoke ver.)"
4 Fuyumi: "Kaze no youni (Karaoke ver.)"
5 Lemon Angel message

External links
LEMON ANGEL PROJECT Official Website
LEMON ANGEL PROJECT Producer's Blog

Drama anime and manga
Music in anime and manga
Anime with original screenplays
Japanese idols in anime and manga